Once Again, with Feeling! is a twenty song compilation by recording artist Jim Bianco.  Released August 25, 2009, this compilation features eleven popular tracks from three of Bianco's studio albums and nine previously unreleased tracks from Bianco's collection of demos, alternate versions and B-sides.

This album was released exclusively through NoiseTrade.com.  NoiseTrade, in conjunction with the artist, allows people to tell five friends about the album in exchange for the ability to download the entire collection for free.  NoiseTrade also offers the option to "pay what you want" for the album.

Track listing
All songs were written by Jim Bianco, except for "Walk on the Wild Side" by Lou Reed and "This Land is Your Land" by Woody Guthrie.
 “Best That You Can Do”– 3:51 from Handsome Devil
 “I Got A Thing For You”– 3:32 from Sing 
“Sing” –3:36 from Sing
“Handsome Devil (Reprise)”– 4:53 from Handsome Devil
 “Tennessee Wedding”– 4:48 from Handsome Devil
”’Cucarachas”–3:39 from Well Within Reason
 “Painkiller”– 3:16 from Sing
“Untended Fires”–3:22 from Handsome Devil
“Southpaw”–3:39 from Well Within Reason
 “Belong”– 3:11 from Sing
 “Long Way Home”– 3:32 from Well Within Reason
“This Land Is Your Land” –2:00 previously unreleased track
“I Love You, Too”– 3:01 previously unreleased track 
 “The Stuff”– 2:40 previously unreleased track
”’Wild Side” –4:03 previously released as bonus track on Jim Bianco Live at the Hotel Cafe
 “Talented”– 4:26 previously unreleased track
“Wrecking Ball"(alternate version)–3:22 previously unreleased track 
“Play It One Last Time”–3:31 previously unreleased track
“Lift” –3:36 previously unreleased track
“Never Again"(alternate version)–3:31 previously unreleased track

Personnel
For personnel information, please see the individual album pages.
Well Within Reason 
Handsome Devil
Sing

Production information
Album Cover Photograph by Sarah Simon
Album Cover Art by Jim Bianco

External links
 Official Jim Bianco website

Jim Bianco albums
2009 compilation albums